Kangeta is a settlement in Meru County, Kenya. It is a major producer of khat, commonly known as 'miraa'.

References 

Populated places in Eastern Province (Kenya)